was a railway station on the Iwaizumi Line in Iwaizumi, Iwate, Japan, operated by East Japan Railway Company (JR East).

Lines
Iwate-Ōkawa Station was a station on the Iwaizumi Line, and was located 25.8 rail kilometers from the opposing terminus of the line at Moichi Station.

Station layout
Iwate-Ōkawa Station had a single side platform serving traffic in both directions. The station was unattended.

History
Iwate-Ōkawa Station opened on 16 May 1957. The station was absorbed into the JR East network upon the privatization of the Japanese National Railways (JNR) on 1 April 1987.  The operation of the Iwaizumi Line was suspended from July 2010 and the line was officially closed on 1 April 2014.

Surrounding area
 Iwate-Ōkawa Post Office
Japan National Route 340

References

Railway stations in Japan opened in 1954
Railway stations in Iwate Prefecture
Iwaizumi Line
Defunct railway stations in Japan
Railway stations closed in 2014